The Hucksters is a 1947 Metro-Goldwyn-Mayer film directed by Jack Conway starring Clark Gable and Deborah Kerr, her debut in an American film. The supporting cast includes Sydney Greenstreet, Adolphe Menjou, Ava Gardner, Keenan Wynn, and Edward Arnold. The movie is based on the novel The Hucksters by Frederic Wakeman Sr., a skewering of the post-World War II radio advertising industry with Gable's character alternating in pursuit of Kerr and Gardner.

Plot

Victor Norman (Clark Gable) is a radio advertising executive just returned from serving in World War II and looking for a job in his old field. He literally throws a few loose dollars out the hotel window, telling the hotel valet that being down to his last even $50 "will help me seem sincere about not needing a job." On his way to his interview, he stops and spends 35 of them on a "sincere" hand-painted necktie.

His appointment is at the Kimberly Advertising Agency, with Mr. Kimberly himself (Adolphe Menjou). As the two size each other up, they are interrupted by a phone call from Evan Llewellyn Evans (Sydney Greenstreet), the tyrannical, high-volume chief of the Beautee Soap company, the agency's largest account. The call throws the staff into turmoil and derails Vic's interview, so he offers to perform an unpleasant task for Kimberly: recruit Mrs. Kay Dorrance (Deborah Kerr), widow of a WWII U.S. general and of noble British birth, for a Beautee soap campaign featuring Manhattan socialites.

A phone call to the Dorrance home misrepresenting himself as being from the "Charity League" gets him an appointment.  At the elegant Sutton Place townhouse, he rapidly charms Kay into agreeing, learning in the process she is not so well-heeled as the home and address suggest, but when they later arrive at the photo shoot, the Beautee art director produces a layout featuring "a loose and flouncy" negligee. Vic overrules the concept and directs a dignified portrait of Kay, in an evening gown, flanked by her children.

In the next day's maelstrom, Vic and "Kim" are summoned to Beautee's offices, where they are confronted by Mr. Evans, whose first action is to expectorate heartily onto his conference table. He summarizes his philosophy on advertising: "You have just seen me do a disgusting thing, but you will always remember it!" He confronts Vic about the change to his Dorrance ad, and Vic tells him, "Beautee soap is a clean product—and your advertisement is not clean." When Vic plays the radio commercial he produced overnight—"Love That Soap"—Evans likes it and directs Kim to hire Vic. "You have your teeth in our problems," he says, removing and brandishing his own dentures.

Vic finds himself attracted to Kay. When the two double-date with Mr. and Mrs. Kimberly, a belligerently drunken Kim confesses that he started his agency by informing on his mentor to government authorities and stealing the Beautee soap account. The featured performer at the nightclub the couples attend is an apparent old flame of Vic's, Jean Ogilvie (Ava Gardner), a torch singer he had run into and chatted up at his first visit to the Kimberly agency just days earlier.  She acts very familiar with Vic in front of his date, unsettling Kay. In the wake of an evening spoiled by Kimberly's behavior, Vic persuades Kay to watch the sunset together at the beach, where they grow close.  In the morning glow, he arranges a purportedly above-board weekend getaway for the couple at a seaside haunt in Connecticut he had used for prewar trysting. When Kay arrives and finds that the place has slipped under its new owner and that the pair have been booked into adjoining rooms with a connecting door, she leaves, disgusted at the circumstances and profoundly disappointed in Vic.

Evans summons Vic and Kim to an abrupt Sunday-morning "chat-chat" and reveals he wants a new radio variety show built around C-list ex-burlesque comedian Buddy Hare (Keenan Wynn). Chastising the ad men for his having to do their work for them, Evans informs them that Hare's agent Dave Lash (Edward Arnold) will be leaving for the coast on that evening's train. Vic promises to ink a deal on board, before word of Evans's interest leaks out and boosts Hare's price. On the way to the station, he stops at Kay's house, but she is remote: "You'll make any promise to make your point," and he replies, "That's the kind of guy I am." Their parting is unsettling for each.

On the train, Vic bumps again into Jean Ogilvie, whom he recruits for his plan to sign Hare; with her shilling, he gets Lash to offer Hare at a bargain basement price. They shake on the deal, and when Lash realizes he has been had, he graciously agrees to honor it.

Once in Hollywood, Vic and his writers set about creating the radio show for Hare; early on, they ban him from the proceedings because he is so obnoxious and his jokes are both off-key and threadbare. Vic accepts an invitation from Jean for dinner at her place, where both ruefully discover Vic is still in love with Kay.  He is surprised to find Kay in the shadows outside his bungalow when he returns, there to try to patch things up. She is successful—Vic starts talking marriage, and seeing himself as a breadwinner for Kay and her children.

Trouble intervenes when a legal technicality threatens the contract with Buddy Hare. Though it appears to be based on an honest mistake by Lash, Vic uses cruel innuendo about Lash's childhood and implied blackmail to get the agent to agree to absorb the large loss he will face making good. Vic immediately regrets the tactic, and Lash's wounded demeanor makes him feel even shabbier.

Back in New York with a recording of the proposed show in hand, Vic and Kim are summoned to a 2:00 am meeting with Evans immediately upon Vic's arrival. The newly compliant Vic—now with thoughts of a family to feed—finds himself groveling like everyone else in the room, and realizes it is not for him. Though Evans liked the show, Vic gets up, tells Evans off for his imperious and belittling behavior, and strides out of the room.

Outside in Kay's car, Vic announces their marriage will have to wait until he can regain his earning power. She replies that the kind of money he thinks he needs and believes she would both desire and deserve is not important—that he "can sell things with dignity and taste." He reaches in his pocket, fetches out his last pocket money, and hurls it up the street. "Now we're starting with exactly nothing," he says, "it's neater that way."

Cast
 Clark Gable as Victor Albee Norman
 Deborah Kerr as Kay Dorrance
 Sydney Greenstreet as Evan Llewellyn Evans
 Adolphe Menjou as Mr. Kimberly
 Ava Gardner as Jean Ogilvie
 Keenan Wynn as Buddy Hare
 Edward Arnold as David Lash
 Aubrey Mather as Mr. Glass
 Richard Gaines as Cooke
 Frank Albertson as Max Herman
 Douglas Fowley as Georgie Gaver
 Clinton Sundberg as Michael Michaelson
 Gloria Holden as Mrs. Kimberly
 Connie Gilchrist as Betty
 Kathryn Card as Regina Kennedy
 Lillian Bronson as Miss Hammer
 Vera Marshe as Gloria
 Ralph Bunker as Allison
 Virginia Dale as Kimberly Receptionist
 Jimmy Conlin as Blake
 Gordon Richards as Conrad, Kimberly Butler

Production
Frederic Wakeman's novel The Hucksters (1946) spent 35 weeks in the top stratum of The New York Times Fiction bestseller list, aided perhaps by its raunchy, racy controversy. Life magazine called the book "last year's best-selling travesty" and even Clark Gable, who would eventually star in its film adaptation, said "It's filthy and it isn't entertainment." Lifes and Gable's literary sensibilities to the contrary, Metro-Goldwyn-Mayer paid $200,000 for the motion picture rights before the novel was even published.

Screenwriter Luther Davis and the novel's adapters Edward Choderov and George Wells had "an extensive laundering job" to do to bring the project into compliance with Louis B. Mayer's tastes and the Hays Office's policies. They had to eliminate the graphic (for 1946) sexual scenes, and they changed the book's Mrs. Dorrance from a married woman into a war widow—so she and Vic "could live happily ever after." More problematic, though, was the portrayal of the talent agent David Lash, a pivotal character in the second half of the film. Lash was based on Jules Stein, the founder of talent agency MCA, and Lash's Hucksters protégé Freddie Callahan, who bore an undeniable physical resemblance to Lew Wasserman, Stein's protégé in 1946 who would eventually head MCA himself.

Even in 1947, there were "fears about reprisals from MCA" over the portrayals of Stein and Wasserman, and Vic avers on several occasions that "Dave Lash is an honest man" when the dispute arises over the Buddy Hare contract. The other problem was Lash/Stein's ethnicity: in the novel, Vic tells Lash people will call his honesty into question because he is a Jew; Davis removed all references to Lash's ethnicity and made him a kid who had been in trouble but had "gone straight" and succeeded.

Once the toned-down screenplay was finished and Clark Gable's comfort with it secured, producer Arthur Hornblow Jr. made his final casting decisions and "assembled an exceptional supporting cast" featuring Sidney Greenstreet, Adolphe Menjou and Edward Arnold, Keenan Wynn and the then "still-unknown Ava Gardner." MGM executives had selected The Hucksters as the debut Hollywood film for Kerr, who had drawn attention for her appearances in ten  films in her native England since 1941, causing production to be "rushed by Louis B. Mayer, who wanted to release it the following August, trying to revive Gable's name after the flop of Adventure, his last film and launching Deborah's in Hollywood."

As the start of production neared, Ava Gardner grew nervous about appearing with Gable, an actor she had idolized since childhood. Hornblow asked Gable to call her, and he told her: "I'm supposed to talk you into doing this thing. But I'm not going to. I hated it when they did that to me. But I hope you change your mind, kid, I think it would be fun to work together." The two remained friends for the rest of Gable's life.

Gable also sought to make a nervous Kerr feel relaxed when shooting commenced. He sent her six dozen roses on the first day, and "the two hit it off beautifully from the beginning, on and off the set."

Director Jack Conway, an MGM regular with credits stretching back to the silent era, brought this, his penultimate film, in on Mayer's August 1947 timetable. His budget was $2.3 million.

Release
MGM used a "splash" approach on The Hucksters, opening in 350 theaters on July 17, 1947 before expanding to 1,000 theaters a week later, one of the widest releases of the time.

Reception

Critical reception
Although Louis B. Mayer had chosen carefully—and spent lavishly—on a property to launch Deborah Kerr and attempt to recoup Clark Gable's popularity after the poorly received Adventure, The Hucksters was not well received by contemporary critics.

Life magazine had excoriated the Wakeman novel, and its film reviewer commented: "The movie version of the famous attack on the advertising business fails to live up to its own ads" and called it "[a] cynically exaggerated study of big business and big advertising."

Bosley Crowther, film critic for The New York Times, wrote that it was simply too much Gable. "[U]nless you like Clark Gable very much, you are going to find him monotonous in this hour-and-fifty-five-minute film... [he] is off the screen for all of five minutes—maybe eight. The rest of the time, he's on." He liked Deborah Kerr rather more: "We could do with a little more of her. Not that her rather radiant passion for this well-tailored roughneck makes much sense, but Miss Kerr is a very soothing person and she elevates the tone of the film." He saved his biggest praise for Greenstreet and Menjou, calling their contributions "entertaining and fascinating."

Brog. of Variety was lukewarm: "Somehow Clark Gable just doesn't quite take hold of the huckster part in signal manner. Same goes for Deborah Kerr who is a shade prissy for her volatile romantic role." Like the Times, they were more enthusiastic about the supporting cast: "Sydney Greenstreet's portrayal of the soap despot emerges as the performance of the picture, as does Keenan Wynn as the ham ex-burlesque candy butcher gone radio comic. Ava Gardner is thoroughly believable as the on-the-make songstress; Adolphe Menjou is the harassed head of the radio agency which caters to Evans' whilom ways because it's a $10 million account." Finally, there was an observation, politely put, that no doubt crossed the minds of many 1947 moviegoers: "Gable looks trim and fit but somehow a shade too mature for the capricious role of the huckster who talks his way into a $35,000 job [and] is a killer with the femmes...."

Gable's interaction with the two women in the story generated commentary. When it came to the romance between Vic and Kay, Life magazine stuck to its negative guns: "The love story is stupefyingly dull. Opposite the ladylike Deborah, Clark Gable's mannered virility seems embarrassing—something that never happened to him alongside such tough Tessies as Joan Crawford and Jean Harlow in his greater days." But others applauded Kerr and the pairing: The Hollywood Reporter called Kerr "a charming English star... a delightful personality in her American debut." The New York Herald-Tribune called the Gable-Kerr pairing "ideal", saying "she made an impressive bow on the U.S. screen."

Ava Gardner biographer Lee Server, pointing to the chemistry between Vic and his old flame Jean Ogilvie (Gable and Gardner): "proved to be a wonderful pairing, with an on-screen spark between them that revealed their genuine amusement and easy pleasure in each other's company."

Judgment about The Hucksters has mellowed over the years. Halliwell's Film Guide calls it "good topical entertainment which still entertains and gives a good impression of its period", also praising the performance of Greenstreet. The current New York Times capsule summary calls it "one of Clark Gable's best postwar films, as well as one of the finest Hollywood satires of the rarefied world of advertising."

Box office
The Hucksters opened at number one at the US box office, with a non-holiday record in New York City. It finished twelfth at the box office for 1947, earning $3,635,000 in the US and Canada and $810,000 elsewhere, resulting in a profit of $412,000. Topping that list was another soldiers-come-home tale, The Best Years of Our Lives. Author Denise Mann suggests that Vic Norman's unsavory side might have held The Hucksters back: "Clark Gable's unheroic ad-man as post-war returning hero may have contributed to the smaller returns." It also "was a total failure in the foreign market, which in those days knew nothing about American advertising or commercial broadcasting."

Home media
The Hucksters was released on VHS. Its first DVD release was in August 2011 as part of the Warner Archive Collection.

References

External links

 
 
 
 

1947 films
1947 comedy-drama films
American black-and-white films
American business films
American comedy-drama films
American satirical films
Films about advertising
Films about radio
Films based on American novels
Films directed by Jack Conway
Films scored by Lennie Hayton
Films set in Los Angeles
Films set in New York City
Metro-Goldwyn-Mayer films
Films with screenplays by George Wells
1940s American films